The following is a list of notable Indian inline skaters and figure skaters.

Dhanush Babu Known as Fastest Skater of India.
Satya Prakash.
Sarvesh Amte.
Anup Kumar Yama.
Avani Bharath Panchal.
Dhruv Singh Kushwaha.

References

Indian sportspeople
Figure skaters
Speed skaters